Third-level education in the Republic of Ireland includes all education after second-level, encompassing higher education in universities and colleges and further education on Post Leaving Certificate (PLC) and other courses. The degree-awarding institutions which can grant awards at all academic levels are the University of Dublin, National University of Ireland (Cork, Dublin, Galway and Maynooth), University of Limerick, Dublin City University, Technological University Dublin, the Royal College of Surgeons in Ireland, Munster Technological University and Technological University of the Shannon: Midlands Midwest, as well as St. Patrick's College, Maynooth (Pontifical University), and then a State agency, Quality and Qualifications Ireland, can grant awards in other institutions directly, or delegate the authority to do so.  and University of Limerick.  The King's Inns of Dublin has a limited role in education specialising in the preparation of candidates for the degree of barrister-at-law to practice as barristers. Medical schools in Ireland also have particular regulation. There were seven establishments of higher education within Ireland ranked among the top 500 universities worldwide by the Times Higher Education Supplement in 2008.

Framework

Institutions
The Irish universities include the University of Dublin, better known by the name of its sole college, Trinity College Dublin, the four constituent universities of the National University of Ireland, two universities established in 1989, three technological universities formed by the amalgamation of Institutes of Technology and a professional medical institution.  Some colleges are constituent colleges of universities, while others are designated institutions of the State agency Quality and Qualifications Ireland (QQI), which succeeded the Higher Education and Training Awards Council. The latter include the remaining Institutes of Technology, Colleges of Education, and other independent colleges. Some colleges have "delegated authority" from QQI, this allows them to confer and validate awards in their own name.

Some institutions such as the University of Limerick, Technological University Dublin (TU Dublin), and Dublin City University (DCU) have completed a process of modularising their courses (others are still in a transition phase), mostly using the ECTS. The Bologna process and applied research are the current concerns of national educational policy, additional concerns include the structures of the National University of Ireland. Since the mid-2000s, a number of Institutes of Technology have or are in the process of applying for university designation, including IT Sligo, GMIT and LYIT, (known as the Connacht Ulster Alliance), and Waterford. In 2019 TU Dublin amalgamated three institutions in the Dublin region (Dublin Institute of Technology, Institute of Technology, Blanchardstown, and Institute of Technology, Tallaght), and in 2021 Munster Technological University amalgamated two institutions in the Munster region (Cork Institute of Technology, and Institute of Technology, Tralee), while the Technological University of the Shannon: Midlands Midwest did the same further north.

The Marks & Standards document, offered by most institutions, can be consulted for information on the range and criteria set down for awards, while programme specifications offer additional information. In contrast to practice in the rest of the education system, entry tends to be highly competitive for school leavers; the so-called "Points Race" administered by the Central Applications Office (CAO). In 2001 the percentage of school leavers transferring to third level exceeded 50% for the first time, while as of 2005 it was in excess of 55% and expected to grow at approximately 1% per annum for the next decade.

There are over 25 third-level courses at graduate and postgraduate level offered through the Irish language. Acadamh na hOllscolaíochta Gaeilge is the Irish language Department of the University of Galway and it has different off-campus centres throughout the Gaeltacht regions. Dublin City University has an Irish language department called Fiontar. University College Dublin (UCD), TU Dublin, and Galway-Mayo Institute of Technology (GMIT) also offer similar courses.

All but two of the seven universities in Ireland offer "open" (omnibus entry) Bachelor of Arts degrees through the CAO where the student can choose their specialisation after their first year of study. The two universities that do not offer "open" (omnibus entry) arts degrees, Trinity College Dublin and DCU, do still offer Bachelor of Arts degrees in specific areas of study such as Drama Studies, Journalism, Latin, History, Japanese, and International Relations.

In one, Trinity College Dublin, the applicants wishing to read an Arts degree may apply to the college to read a combination of two subjects, such as French and Philosophy - which the student may continue to read jointly or with focus on one. DCU's de facto omnibus entry arts degree is offered by St. Patrick's College of Education (a college of DCU) and is titled "BA in Humanities". All Hallows College (a college of DCU) offer BA in Humanities, Theology Pastoral Care, and English.

Entry into higher education institutions is normally done through the CAO. In this way, students wishing to enter university apply to the CAO rather than the individual university. Places in courses are usually awarded based on results in the Leaving Certificate Examination or any international equivalent. Each university has a minimum entry requirement, usually requiring a pass grade in either English or Irish, as well as maths. Some also require a pass grade in a modern continental European language (French, German, Spanish or Italian). Each individual course has further entry requirements, for example, science courses usually require a certain grade in one or two sciences. The student must also achieve the number of points required for the course under the points system. However, universities also have systems in place for accepting mature students, and students who have successfully completed a Post Leaving Certificate or Further Education course.

Entry into third-level is generally very high in Ireland (as it also is in Northern Ireland), and among young adults (those aged 25 to 34), 41.6% of them have attained third-level degrees—the second highest level in the EU after Cyprus, and substantially ahead of the average of 29.1%. Broken down by gender, approximately 43% of women and 40% of men Ireland attend third level education.

Fees

Under the "Free Fees Initiative" the Government pays the tuition fees of students who meet relevant course, nationality and residence requirements as set down under the initiative. These requirements include:

 Holding EU nationality, or are a national of member country of the European Economic Area or Switzerland, or those who have been granted official refugee status.
 Having been a resident in an EU Member State for at least three of the five years preceding entry to the course.
 Are not undertaking a second undergraduate course.

Students are required to pay a "registration fee" on entry to their courses. These charges cover costs such as equipment usage, administration fees and exam fees. Charges were €1,500 per student for the 2009/10 school year. These charges have been labelled as "unofficial fees", and some university heads admitted that "student registration charges are fees by any other name".
In 2011, after large annual increases, the registration fee was abolished and replaced with a "student contribution". For the school year 2019/2020 this fee stood at €3,000.

Further education

Further education is vocational and technical education and training in post-compulsory education. Awards are offered by a multitude of bodies, both ad-hoc and statutory. Typical areas included are craft and trade apprenticeships, childcare, farming, retail, and tourism. These are typical areas of the economy that do not depend on multinational investment and recognition. There are many different types of further education awards, known as Post Leaving Certificates.

The Further Education and Training Awards Council conferred awards in the extra-university system. Further education has expanded immensely in recent years helped by the institutions, and because of this the type and range of these awards have been formalized to restore confidence. There were two separate schemes enabling progression for holders of FETAC awards to universities and institutes of technology. FETAC awards carried points that could be used to access higher education. FETAC was dissolved and its functions were passed to Quality and Qualifications Ireland (QQI) on 6 November 2012, and the progression schemes continued.

Grade inflation
Ireland has a higher proportion of third-level graduates than any other EU country, although many university students are better suited to further education and training, including PLC, apprenticeship and traineeship courses. At the same time, the proportion of graduates with first-class honours has reached record levels, particularly in institutes of technology. There is disagreement about whether this increase is due to improved methods of instructing increasingly motivated students, or simple grade inflation. President Michael D. Higgins believes that it is due to grade inflation, and has expressed concern about the continued quality and value of university degrees. Whatever the reason might be, employers increasingly examine graduates' extracurricular activities, work experiences, and soft skills as they search for the most able applicants.

List of higher education establishments
These are lists of colleges and universities within Ireland; some colleges are constituent colleges of universities.

Universities

Recognised as Universities under the Universities Act, 1997 as amended:
Dublin City University
National University of Ireland
Maynooth University
University of Galway
University College Cork
University College Dublin
Royal College of Surgeons in Ireland
University of Limerick
University of Dublin 
Trinity College

Technological Universities 
Technological Universities have been formed by the merger of former Institutes of Technology.
Atlantic Technological University
Munster Technological University
South East Technological University
Technological University Dublin
Technological University of the Shannon: Midlands Midwest

Institutes of technology 
Dún Laoghaire Institute of Art, Design and Technology
Dundalk Institute of Technology

Pontifical University 
St Patrick's College, Maynooth (also known as Maynooth College or the Pontifical University at Maynooth)

Colleges of education 
St Angela's College of Education, Sligo  
Marino Institute of Education  
Mary Immaculate College, Limerick  
St. Patrick's College, Thurles

Recognised, associated or constituent colleges of Irish universities 
Institute of Public Administration  
Irish School of Ecumenics  
National College of Art and Design  
National Maritime College of Ireland  
Shannon College of Hotel Management

National institutions 
Dublin Institute for Advanced Studies
Garda Síochána College
Military College, Curragh Camp
National Ambulance Service College

State-aided and chartered institutions 
Honorable Society of King's Inns
National College of Ireland (formerly National College of Industrial Relations)
Royal Irish Academy of Music
Royal College of Physicians of Ireland (postgraduate medical qualifications)

Other institutions 

American College Dublin
Burren College of Art
Carmelite Institute of Britain and Ireland, theology programmes validated by St. Patrick's College, Maynooth
Cavan Institute
Christian Leadership in Education Office (CLEO), postgraduate education programmes validated by the University of Hull
Church of Ireland Theological Institute (partly in cooperation with Trinity College Dublin)
City Colleges
Coláiste na hÉireann
Coláiste Stiofáin Naofa
College of Progressive Education 
Cork College of Commerce
Digital Skills Academy (historically validated by Dublin Institute of Technology and Boston College)
Dorset College
Dublin Business School
Dublin Institute of Design
Gaiety School of Acting
Galway Business School
The Grafton Academy of Fashion Design
Griffith College Cork
Griffith College Dublin
Griffith College Limerick
Hibernia College
IBAT College Dublin
ICD Business School
Independent College Dublin
Irish Bible Institute (a component of the University of Wales(2005-2013), York St John University since 2014.)
Irish Management Institute  
Kimmage Development Studies Centre (merged into Maynooth University)
Mallow College of Further Education
Newman College Ireland
Pitman Training Ireland
Portobello Institute
The Priory Institute (validated by Institute of Technology, Tallaght)
Spirituality Institute for Research and Education (Masters validated by Waterford Institute of Technology)
St. John's Central College, Cork
St. Nicholas Montessori College
St. Patrick's, Carlow College
Setanta College
Turning Point

Foreign institutions with a presence in Ireland
As well as "Study Abroad" programmes from US universities, a UK institution, a French business school and a number of US universities have presences in Ireland:
Boston College Ireland – delivers "Study Abroad" and summer programmes on St. Stephens Green, central Dublin
Champlain College Ireland - delivers "Study Abroad" programmes to US students at a campus on Leeson Street, central Dublin
Duquesne University – students study in UCD and stay at Duquesne University's St. Michael's House facility
École de management de Normandie - A Dublin campus opened in 2017
Georgia Southern University - Opened in 2019, Georgia Southern University has a campus in Wexford Town
University of Notre Dame – have two centres in Ireland, the new Notre Dame Center at Kylemore Abbey in Connemara and O'Connell House in Dublin wfrom where students study at Trinity or UCD
Open University – the UK based Open University has an Irish office in Dublin
Sacred Heart University – has an Irish studies base in Dingle, County Kerry

Foreign institutions who validate programmes in Ireland
Historically a number of institutions, including seminaries such as St. Patrick's, Carlow College, St. Kieran's College, Kilkenny, St. Patrick's College, Thurles, and Tullabeg College, would have prepared students from examinations with the University of London. In recent years a number of mainly private colleges have had programmes accredited by UK universities.
 University of Chester - National Training Centre, Dublin 
 University of Dundee - in partnership with Ballyfermot College of Further Education since 2004
 University of East London - Institute of Child Education Psychology Europe, Dublin and Chevron Training and Recruitment
 Heriot-Watt University - Griffith College, Limerick
 University of Hull - Christian Leadership in Education Office, Cork, since 1993
 University of Hull - validated programmes at the Irish School of Ecumenics (1972-1982)
 Liverpool John Moores University - validated programmes for DBS
 London Metropolitan University - Portobello Institute
 Middlesex University - PCI College, Dublin
 University of Northumbria - Law Society of Ireland
 Nottingham Trent University - validated degrees for Griffith College
 University of Reading - Irish Management Institute
 University of Ulster - Irish Times Training and Marino Institute of Education
 University of Wales - validated degrees for Portobello College, The Priory Institute and Irish Bible Institute
 University of Wales Trinity Saint David - validates MBA programme at IBAT College, Dublin 
 University of West London - British/Irish Modern Music Institute, Dublin
 University of the West of Scotland - Filmbase, Dublin 
 University of Wolverhampton - Coláiste Dhúlaigh College of Further Education, Coolock and Edenmore
 York St John University - Irish Bible Institute since 2014
 York St John University - validated the Carmelite Institute of Britain and Ireland Masters programme from 2012-2016
 Pontifical University of Saint Thomas Aquinas - award degrees at the Domician Studium
 St John's College, Nottingham - has validated programmes with the Church of Ireland Theological Institute

Defunct institutions 
The following are defunct institutions, due to closure or merger. This list does not include institutions that were renamed.

Albert Agricultural College (1838–1979), part of UCD from 1926-1979, NIHE Dublin (now DCU) was built on Albert College
All Hallows College (1842–2016), now part of Dublin City University 
Apothecaries' Hall, Dublin (1791–1971)
Bandon University, Bandon, Co. Cork (? - Reformation of King Henry VIII) Considered a University by the Papacy
Catholic University of Ireland (1854–1908), evolved into University College Dublin
Church of Ireland College of Education (1816-2016), previously linked to University of Dublin, now part of DCU
Cork Institute of Technology, merged with IT Tralee in 2021 to form Munster Technological University
Froebel College of Education (1943–2013), now part of Maynooth University 
HSI College
IT Tralee, merged with CIT in 2021 to form Munster Technological University
Irish Academy for the Performing Arts (2002–2004)
Kimmage Mission Institute (1991-2005) moved to Milltown and merged with Milltown Institute
Mater Dei Institute of Education (1966–2016), now part of Dublin City University 
Media Lab Europe (2000–05)
Mid West Business Institute, now part of Griffith College Limerick 
Milltown Institute of Theology and Philosophy (1968–2015) 
Newman College, Dublin, merged into Griffith College
Our Lady of Mercy College, Carysfort (1877–1988)
Portobello College Dublin, acquired by Dublin Business School in 2007 
Queen's University of Ireland (1850–82)
Royal University of Ireland (1880–1909), succeeded by the National University of Ireland
St Catherine's College of Education for Home Economics
St Patrick's College of Education (1875–2016), now part of Dublin City University 
Tipperary Institute (1999-2011), now part of Limerick Institute of Technology
Thomond College of Education, Limerick (1973–1991), became part of University of Limerick
Tourism College Killybegs (? - 2001), now part of Letterkenny Institute of Technology
University of Dublin (medieval) (operated intermittently 1320–1534)
Limerick Institute of Technology, merged with AIT in 2021 to form the Technological University of the Shannon (TUS). 
Athlone Institute of Technology, merged with LIT in 2021 to form the Technological University of the Shannon (TUS).

Professional Bodies
 Chartered Accountants Ireland - Accounting professional body
 Institution of Engineers of Ireland (Engineers Ireland) - Engineers professional body
 Law Society of Ireland - Solicitor professional body
 The Honorable Society of King's Inns - Barrister professional body
 Association of Chartered Certified Accountants - Accounting professional body
 Royal Institute of the Architects of Ireland - the professional body for Architects in Ireland

Footnotes 
 College is linked to University of Dublin.
 College is linked to Munster Technological University
 College is linked to National University of Ireland.
 College is linked to University of Galway.
 College is linked to University College Cork.
 College is linked to University of Limerick.

See also 
 List of Ireland-related topics
 Education in the Republic of Ireland
 List of schools in the Republic of Ireland
 Central Applications Office
 HEAnet - Ireland's National Education & Research Network
 Higher Education Authority
 Higher Education and Training Awards Council
 Further Education and Training Awards Council
 ITnet - Institute of Technology Network
 National Qualifications Authority of Ireland
 Postgraduate Applications Centre
 State Examinations Commission
 List of colleges and universities
 List of universities in Northern Ireland
 Open access in the Republic of Ireland

References

External links

Department of Education and Science list of higher education providers in Ireland, updated regularly

 
Universities
Ireland
Ireland education-related lists
Higher education by country